America's Prom Queen is a reality TV series created by consumer marketer Krishnan Menon and produced by PB&J Television that debuted on ABC Family on March 17, 2008. The show follows 10 girls aspiring for the title of "America's Prom Queen". Each week, the girls face a prom-related challenge, and girls will be eliminated until one remains. The show is hosted by former Miss USA, Susie Castillo. On April 21, 2008, Katelyn was crowned America's Prom Queen.

Contestants
Torree Whitney, from Anaheim, CA - Eliminated in Episode 1
Niah Chapman, from Arlington, MA - Eliminated in Episode 2
Samantha Fox, from Costa Mesa, CA - Eliminated in Episode 3
LaShell Alexander, from Burbank, CA - Eliminated in Episode 4
Kendra Cucino, from Providence, RI - Eliminated in Episode 5
Carmen Matheny, from Cleveland, TN - Eliminated in Episode 5
Ashley Arillotta, from North Andover, MA - Eliminated in Episode 5
Macy Erwin, from Chattanooga, TN - Runner-Up
Amanda Eugenio, from Peabody, MA - Runner-Up
Katelyn Morgan, from Yorba Linda, CA - Winner

Committee members
Brooke Hogan, recording artist and television personality
Susan Schulz, editor-in-chief of CosmoGIRL! magazine
Jai Rodriguez, actor, musician, and star of Queer Eye for the Straight Guy
Theo Von, stand-up comedian and former Road Rules contestant
Sean Kingston, singer (guest judge in Episode 2)
Spencer Grammer, actress and star of Greek (guest judge in Episode 5)
Robert Adamson, actor and star of Lincoln Heights (guest judge in Episode 6)

Episodes and eliminations

Summaries

References

External links
 Official ABC Site
 IMDB entry for "America's Prom Queen"

Modeling-themed reality television series
ABC Family original programming
2008 American television series debuts
2008 American television series endings
2000s American reality television series
Prom